Yùn is a Chinese surname. It is not in the top 400 most common surnames in China, nor was it included in the Hundred Family Surnames poem.

Notable people
 Yun Bing (惲冰, fl. 17th century), artist specialising in the "boneless" technique
 Yun Shouping (惲壽平, 1633 – 1690), also known as Yun Nantian (南田), one of the Six Masters of the early Qing period
 Yun Zhu (惲珠, 1771–1833), a poet, painter, and anthologist
 Yun Daiying (恽代英, 1895–1931), early leader of the Communist Party executed by the Kuomintang
 Yun Zhiwei (恽之玮, born 1982), mathematician specialising in number theory

Individual Chinese surnames
Chinese-language surnames not found in the Hundred Family Surnames